= Parliamentary Conference on the World Trade Organization =

The Parliamentary Conference on the World Trade Organization is a group that is organized jointly by the Inter-Parliamentary Union and the European Parliament. Its steering committee is composed of around 30 representatives from various member parliaments. According to Debra Steger,

"the overwhelming success of the Parliamentary Conferences on the WTO reflects the great interest of parliamentarians in the work of the WTO, as well as the need for an international forum that will provide legislators from different countries with an opportunity to exchange views and contribute to WTO decision-making."
